Masdevallia ignea is a species of orchid endemic to Colombia.

References

External links 

ignea
Endemic orchids of Colombia